James Alexander Lockhart (June 2, 1850 – December 24, 1905) was a United States representative from North Carolina. He was born in Anson County, North Carolina, on June 2, 1850, and attended the common schools. Lockhart graduated from Trinity College, in Durham, North Carolina, in June 1873; he studied law in Charlotte, North Carolina, and was admitted to the bar in 1874.

He settled in Wadesboro, North Carolina, where he practiced law. He was elected mayor of Wadesboro in 1875. He served in the North Carolina House of Representatives in 1879 and in the North Carolina Senate in 1881.

Lockhart, a Democrat, presented his credentials as a Member-elect to the Fifty-fourth Congress and served from March 4, 1895, to June 5, 1896, when he was unseated in favor of Charles H. Martin, who had contested the results of the 1894 election. Lockhart faced Martin again in the election of 1896, which Martin won by a large margin.

Lockhart resumed his law practice in Wadesboro. He died in Charlotte, on December 24, 1905. He was buried in Eastview Cemetery, in Wadesboro.

References

External links

Democratic Party North Carolina state senators
Democratic Party members of the North Carolina House of Representatives
1850 births
1905 deaths
People from Wadesboro, North Carolina
Mayors of places in North Carolina
Democratic Party members of the United States House of Representatives from North Carolina
19th-century American politicians